The Sam Tung Uk Museum is a museum restored from Sam Tung Uk (which describes the original floorplan), a Hakka walled village in Tsuen Wan, Hong Kong.

History
It was built by a Chan (pronounced "chin2 (or tshin2)" in the Hakka dialect) clan under the leadership of the clan patriarch, Chan Yam-shing, in 1786 during the Qing dynasty. The Chan clan was originally from Fujian; they had moved to Guangdong, and then to Hong Kong to engage in farming. The site has been carefully restored and opened to the public as a museum.

Sam Tung Uk was vacated in April 1980 and declared a historic monument in March 1981. The Hong Kong government funded its restoration and converted it into a museum between 1986 and 1987. The restoration work won the Pacific Heritage Award of the Pacific Asia Tourist Association in 1990.

Museum
The entrance, assembly and ancestral halls, and twelve of the original houses are preserved. Other rooms have been modified to accommodate a reception area, an orientation room, an exhibition hall, a museum office, and a lecture theatre. The agricultural implements and everyday objects of Hakka village life are on permanent display. The main exhibition hall at the far end of the building complex changes its displays approximately every six months.  Documentation of the restoration process is on display in Orientation Room.

The Sam Tung Uk Museum is open from 09:00 to 17:00 every day of the year except Tuesdays, Christmas Day, Boxing Day, New Year's Day, and the first three days of the Lunar New Year. Admission is free of charge. It can be accessed from the MTR Tsuen Wan station.

See also
 Walled villages of Hong Kong
 Sam Tung Uk Resite Village

References

External links

 Sam Tung Uk Museum
 1960 photograph of Sam Tung Uk
 CityLife. Sam Tung Uk

History museums in Hong Kong
Declared monuments of Hong Kong
Rural history museums in Asia
Tsuen Wan
Hakka culture in Hong Kong
Walled villages of Hong Kong
Architecture in China
Historic house museums in China
Houses completed in 1786
Museums established in 1987
1987 establishments in Hong Kong
Villages in Tsuen Wan District, Hong Kong